3rd Desire (Reve) is the third extended play by South Korean soloist Kim Woo-seok. It was released on March 7, 2022, under TOP Media. It is available in two versions and contains six tracks, with "Switch" released as the lead single.

Background 
In February, it was announced that Kim was working on his third EP. On March 7, 2022, 3rd Desire (Reve) was released along with the lead single "Switch". On March 18, Kim won first place on Music Bank.

Track listing

Charts

Weekly charts

Monthly charts

Singles

Accolades

Release history

References 

2022 EPs
K-pop EPs
Korean-language EPs